The David Wilmot Public School For Coloured Children, also known as the J.C. King Educational Building, is located the Frankford neighborhood of Philadelphia, Pennsylvania.
Built in 1874, it is a two-story, four bay, stone building in the Italianate-design presumably of Lewis H. Esler (1819-1883), a prominent architect employed by the Philadelphia Board of Public Education.  

An addition was built in 1908. It features brownstone sills and arches and a gable over the entrance opening.  It was named for U.S. political figure and abolitionist, David Wilmot (1814–1868).

It was added to the National Register of Historic Places in 1988.

References

School buildings on the National Register of Historic Places in Philadelphia
Italianate architecture in Pennsylvania
School buildings completed in 1874
Frankford, Philadelphia